The 2006 FIBA U16 European Championship Division C was held in Andorra la Vella, Andorra, from 25 to 30 July 2006. Eight teams participated in the competition.

Participating teams
 (hosts)

Group phase

Group A

Group B

Knockout stage

Bracket

5–8th place bracket

5th – 8th place classification

Semifinals

7th place game

5th place game

3rd place game

Final

Final standings

External links
Official website

2005–06 in European basketball
FIBA U16
July 2006 sports events in Europe
FIBA U16 European Championship Division C